Klyuchi is a rural locality (a selo) in Nikolsky Selsoviet of Belogorsky District, Amur Oblast, Russia. The population was 184 as of 2018. There are 4 streets.

Geography 
The village is located on the left bank of the Tom River, 24 km west of Belogorsk (the district's administrative centre) by road. Kiseleozyorka is the nearest rural locality.

References 

Rural localities in Belogorsky District